The All-Out Defense Mobilization Agency is the reserve mobilization agency of Taiwan.

History 
In May 2021 the Legislative Yuan passed legislation which authorized the All-Out Defense Mobilization Agency.

The agency was inaugurated on December 30 2021 with an official launch date of January 1, 2022. It was created through the merger of the All-out Defense Mobilization Office and the Armed Forces Reserve Command.

Purpose 
The agency was established to enhance Taiwan's ability to deter a Chinese invasion through asymmetric means.

Organization 
The starting strength of the agency was 150 full time staff.

Affiliated troops 
 Armed Forces Reserve

See also 
 Civil defense in Taiwan

References 

Military logistics of Taiwan